Lee Odiss Bass III (May 2, 1943 – February 3, 2022), better known as Mickey Bass, was an American bassist, composer, arranger, and music educator. He played with Chico Freeman, John Hicks, and Kiane Zawadi.

Bass was a Pittsburgh bassist who worked with hard bop bandleaders and combos from the 1960s; he did not record often as a leader. His maternal grandmother, who performed in minstrel shows, taught him and his cousins Barbershop music. He played and recorded with Sonny Rollins, Bennie Green, and Charles Mingus. The New York Times declared: "When Mickey Bass and the Co-operation get in the right groove...it is doubtful if there is another jazz group in town that swings as hard as this one."

He taught students at Duke Ellington School of the Arts and Hartt College of Music from 1975 to 1985. His students at Ellington included Wallace Roney, Gregory Charles Royal, Clarence Seay, and drummer Eric Allen. In 1980, he was given a National Endowment for the Arts Composers' Grant.

Bass died in New York City on February 3, 2022, at the age of 78.

Discography

As leader
 Sentimental Mood (Chiaroscuro, 1982)
 The Co-operation (Early Bird, 1991)
 Another Way Out  (Early Bird, 1991)

As sideman
With Art Blakey
 Child's Dance (Prestige, 1972)
 Buhaina (Prestige, 1973)
 Anthenagin (Prestige, 1973)
With Curtis Fuller
 Smokin' (Mainstream, 1972)
With Philly Joe Jones
Mean What You Say (Sonet, 1977)
With Jimmy McGriff
 Concert: Friday the 13th - Cook County Jail (Groove Merchant. 1972 [1973])
With Hank Mobley
 Thinking of Home (Blue Note, 1973)
With Ramon Morris
 Sweet Sister Funk (Groove Merchant, 1973)
With Lee Morgan
 The Sixth Sense (Blue Note, 1968 [1999])
With Bobby Timmons
 Chicken & Dumplin's (Prestige, 1965)
 Soul Food (Prestige, 1966)
With Reuben Wilson
 The Sweet Life (Groove Merchant, 1973)

References

External links 
 AllMusic

1943 births
2022 deaths
20th-century African-American musicians
20th-century American guitarists
21st-century African-American musicians
Musicians from Pittsburgh
American bass guitarists
The Jazz Messengers members
Guitarists from Pennsylvania